Khavin may refer to:

Khavin Rood, a village in Misheh Pareh Rural District, Kaleybar County, East Azerbaijan Province, Iran
Abram Khavin (1914–1974), Ukrainian chess master
 or Victor Havin, Russian mathematician